U.K. Subs are an English punk rock band, among the earliest in the first wave of British punk. Formed in 1976, the mainstay of the band has been vocalist Charlie Harper, originally a singer in Britain's R&B scene. They were also one of the first hardcore punk bands.

Career

1976–1978 

Although the U.K. Subs were part of the original punk movement in England, the band originally started playing as part of the pub rock scene under the name The Marauders. In 1976, after seeing a couple of punk rock shows at The Roxy, the band decided to become a punk rock band, changing their name at first to the Subversives but later modifying it to the U.K. Subs. The band consisted of founder Charlie Harper, guitarist Nicky Garratt, bassist Paul Slack, and a drummer who went under the name Rory Lyons. By the time the band recorded their first single, Pete Davies had replaced Lyons and was the band's regular drummer.

Their style combined the energy of punk and the rock and roll edge of the then-thriving pub rock scene. The band's first six hit singles, including "Stranglehold", "Warhead", "Teenage", and "Tomorrow's Girls", all managed to enter the Top 40 of the UK Singles Chart. Their first four albums would also make the U.K. charts. However, they never had another single or album make the charts after 1981.

The first two songs released by the band were on the April 1978, Farewell to the Roxy album. The two songs, "I Live in a Car" and "Telephone Numbers," were recorded live at a December 31, 1977 show at The Roxy. The U.K. Subs were the first band on the bill at the show that night with Rory Lyons on drums. The recording of this show was later released as the album Live Kicks in 1980.

In 1978, the band released their first single, "CID," on City Records, a UK-based underground label. The band played two John Peel sessions in 1978, and a third in June 1979, for BBC Radio 1. These sessions were subsequently released together on a single album, Peel Sessions, in 2003. Also, in 1978, the band played some opening gigs for The Police. In 1979, Julien Temple wrote and directed a short film Punk Can Take It, a parody of wartime documentaries, that consisted mainly of U.K. Subs playing live on stage. The film was released theatrically.

1979–1981 

In May 1979, the band signed to GEM Records, a punk rock offshoot of RCA Records. Their first single for GEM, "Stranglehold," was released in June 1979. It was followed by "Tomorrow's Girls" which was released in August 1979. Their debut album, Another Kind of Blues, was released in October 1979 with their second album, Brand New Age following in April 1980. Several EPs were also released in this period and their singles "Teenage" and "Warhead" both made the U.K. charts. Their third album, a live album entitled Crash Course, was recorded at the Rainbow Theatre in London on 30 May 1980 during the Brand New Age tour. Released in 1980, it was their biggest selling album ever.

In June 1980, Davies and Slack left the band and were replaced with bassist Alvin Gibbs and drummer Steve Roberts. At this point some of the songs took on a more heavy metal-influenced edge. In February 1981, the band released their fourth album, Diminished Responsibility which was the final U.K. Subs album to chart in the U.K. In April 1981, they released the non-album single "Keep on Running (Til You Burn)", their sixth single for GEM, and the last single by the U.K. Subs to chart in the U.K. It was also their last release on GEM Records as the label folded soon after the release of the single.

1982–1983 

The band recorded their next album at the rural Jacobs Studio in Farnham, Surrey in the south of England. Endangered Species was released 19 March 1982 on the band's new label, NEMS, which also folded shortly after the release of the album. Harper and Garratt both consider this album to be the U.K. Sub's best album. Following the recording of the album, Steve Roberts was fired at the end of 1981 and the Subs used both Mal Aisling and John Towe as replacements. The band toured the U.S. in support of the album, hoping to get signed to a U.S. label. It was their second tour of the U.S.; the first occurring in 1979. In July 1982, they became the first Western band to perform in Poland since the imposition of martial law, and the suppression of the trade union Solidarity. Their concert was held in Gdańsk, and they were supported by Brygada Kryzys.

In 1983, the band released the three-song Shake Up the City EP on Abstract Records, also recorded at Jacobs studios. Drummer Kim Wylie played on the EP and for the subsequent tours of the U.K., Europe, and the U.S. They again played several concerts in Poland in 1983 with new wave Polish band Republika. Differences in musical direction, as well as the inability to secure a U.S. record deal, led to Gibbs, Garrett, and Harper going their separate ways, although Harper would continue to use the U.K. Subs name with frequently changing members backing him. The three would reunite for the first time in July 1988 to record Killing Time.

1984–present 

In 1991, U.K. Subs also had Lars Frederiksen (now of Rancid) on guitar for a 30 date UK tour. Decades after the disbanding of other late-1970s punk groups such as the Sex Pistols and The Clash, U.K. Subs continued to perform.

The U.K. Subs song "Down on the Farm" was covered by Guns N' Roses on their 1993 covers album "The Spaghetti Incident?". U.K. Subs joined the bill for the 2006 Fiend Fest. The band have toured with The Misfits, The Adicts, Osaka Popstar, Agent Orange, and The Ramones. The U.K. Subs song "Warhead" is played in the movie, This Is England. U.K. Subs are one of the regular bands to play the Rebellion Festival nearly every year since its origins as The Holidays in the Sun Festival in 1996.

In 2002, the band was featured with D.R.I and The Eight Bucks Experiment on a compilation 7 inch record called F*#k You Punks vol.3. With an anti terrorist song called "Terrorista".

In 2007, drummer Jamie Oliver was a contestant on the UK quiz show Nothing But the Truth. Vocalist Charlie Harper was among the panel of witnesses. Oliver reached the £5000 mark, but lost it all in a bid to double his winnings.

In recent years, the band's work has been critical of British politician Nick Clegg, with the 2013 song "Coalition Government Blues" describing the Liberal Democrats' leader as "liking his perks". The band's 2015 album Yellow Leader was widely suspected of referring to Clegg, with yellow being the official colour of his political party.

To celebrate 40 years since its release, Demon Records issued a special edition copy of Another Kind of Blues in a box set of two 10" coloured vinyl on 13 April 2019. This was soon followed by the next album in succession, Brand New Age on 12 July 2019. Crash Course and Diminished Responsibility have also been reissued and Cleopatra Records has released an expanded version of Endangered Species.  In September 2021, to celebrate 40 years since the band's concert at Gossips, the official live cassette of the show was rereleased on CD and Download as Danger: The Chaos Tape via Cherry Red.

On 17 October 2021, Alvin Gibbs announced on Facebook that "Charlie Harper, Steve Straughan and I have decided Jamie Oliver will no longer continue as drummer for the UK Subs" over his "his post seemingly celebrating the tragic and abhorrent death of Conservative MP, David Amess". Anti-Pasti drummer, Kevin Nixon, agreed to temporarily take over the role vacated by Oliver, enabling the band to meet live commitments in France in October 2021.

In what was advertised as the U.K. Subs' final album, Reverse Engineering - a studio record of new material - was released on 1 July 2022.

On 20 August 2022, the band played what was billed as their "last ever" show on the island of Ireland, performing at Voodoo in Belfast.

Former drummer Steve Roberts died on 13 October 2022.

In December 2022 the band announced their drummer Dave Humphries has left the band.

European and UK tours planned for 2023 were advertised as being the "final full" tours by the U.K. Subs. The band added: "Rest assured - the band will then continue to play Festivals and the occasional mini weekend tour in various countries as and when."

Album titles and later releases
Successive U.K. Subs album titles start with consecutive letters of the alphabet, although the band released several live albums and compilations that were not part of the 26 alphabetical titles. All but one of their 21 studio albums are a part of this 26 album sequence while the two albums consisting solely of covers are not part of the sequence. The six non-studio albums in the sequence comprise four live albums, Sub Mission: The Best of the U.K. Subs 1982–1998, a compilation album which also contained a bonus disc with a live recording from a  show in Bristol in 1991, and Peel Sessions which compiled their three late 1970's sessions with BBC DJ John Peel. In May 2016, the band released an album starting with the letter "Z", Ziezo, which completed their alphabetical series of album titles. The album was recorded in November 2015 at Perry Vale Studios in South London. At the time, the band announced that, although they intended to continue to release EPs and singles, Ziezo would be their last full album. The album was funded through the Crowdfunding site Pledge Music starting on 1 November 2015.

After releasing Ziezo, the Subs released a double single in 2017 and an EP in 2018 in addition to two albums of covers, titled Subversions and Subversions II, which were released in 2018 and 2019, respectively.

On 1 July 2022, Cleopatra Records released the Subs' latest studio album, Reverse Engineering. Alvin Gibbs announced on behalf of the U.K. Subs in January 2021 that the band had begun recording the new album due to the large amount of new material they had written both as a band and individually. He said that this new album "will categorically be the last ever UK Subs album."

Band members 
Current
Charlie Harper - lead vocals and harmonica (1976–present)
 Alvin Gibbs - bass (1980–1983, 1988, 1996, 1999–2002, 2003–present)
 Steve Straughan - guitar (2016–present)

Former

 Richard Anderson - guitar (1976–77)
 Greg Brown - guitar (1977)
 Steve Slack - bass (1976–77, 1983–1984)
 Rory Lyons - drums (1976–1977)
 Robbie Harper - drums, guitar (Rob Milne) (1977)
 Steve J Jones - drums (1977, 1983–1984)
 Nicky Garratt - guitar (1977–1983, 1988, 1996, 1999–2002, 2004–2010)
 Paul Slack - bass (1977–1981, 2008–2010)
 Robby Baldock - drums (1978)
 Pete Davies - drums (1978–1980, 1984, 1991–1996, 2007, 2008)
 Carlos Hyena - guitar (1978)
 Ian "Tanner" Tansley - drums (1980 on Brand New Age Tour – filling in for a sick Pete Davies)
 Steve Roberts - drums (1981–82, 1987, 2002)
 Adam Griffiths - bass (1981–1982)
 Mal Asling AKA 'Sol Mintz' - drums (1982)
 John Towe AKA 'Kim Wylie' - drums (1982–1983, 2003)
 Captain Scarlet (David Lloyd) - guitar (1983–1984)
 Tim Britta - guitar (1984)
 Jim Moncur - guitar (1984–1987)
 Tezz Roberts - bass (1984), guitar (1984–85, 1995, 2002), drums (1988, 1999)
 John Armitage - bass (1984–1985)
 Matthew "Turkey" Best - drums (1984)
 Rab Fae Beith - drums (1984–1986)
 Ricky McGuire - bass (1985–1986)
 Mark Barratt - bass (1986–1987)
 Darrell Barth - guitar (1986–87, 1989–91, 1999)
 Geoff Sewell - drums (1986)
 Knox - guitar (1987)
 Alan Lee - guitar (1987–89)
 Flea (Dave Farrelly) - bass (1987–91)
 Dave Wilkinson - drums (1987)
 Duncan Smith - drums (1987–88)
 Belvy K - drums (1988)
 Matt McCoy - drums (1988–92, 1993, 1995)
 Andy McCoy - guitar (1988)
 Leo Mortimer - drums (1989–90)
 Karl Morris - guitar (1990–1992, 1993)
 Jeff Moe - drums (1991)
 Lars Frederiksen - guitar (1991)
 Johan - guitar (1991)
 Scott Snowden - guitar (1992)
 Alan Campbell - guitar (1992–2004)
 Derek Reid - bass (1995)
 Brian Barnes - bass (1992–1994, 1996–2001, 2002–2004, 2008)
 Greg Cahill - drums (1993 Canada, Argentina tours)
 Dave Ayer - drums (1995–1997)
Gizz Butt - guitar (1996)
 Phil Pain - guitar (1996)
 Benjie Bollox - drums (1996)
 Blitz - drums (1996)
 Michael Richter - drums (1997)
 Gary Baldy (Ostell) - drums (1997–99)
 Carly Guarino - bass (1997)
 Andy Frantic - bass (1997–99)
 Pumpy - drums (1999–2000)
 Tommy Couch - drums (1999–2000)
 Gizz Lazlo - drums (1999, 2006)
 Jason Willer - drums (2001–2006)
 Simon Rankin - guitar (2001), bass (2001–2002)
 Bones - bass (2002)
 Criss Damage - drums (2002)
 Darrah - drums (2002)
 Jay - drums (2002)
 Tommy Krash - bass (2002)
 Alistair Chesters - bass (2002–2007)
 Pete Honkamaki - bass (2002–2003)
 Steve Crittall 'Soho Steve' - guitar (2003)
 Clara Wiseman - bass (2005)
 Jet - guitar (2005–2016)
 Eric Baconstrip - drums (2005)
 Peter 'Goldblade' Byrchmore - guitar (2006)
 Chema Zurita - bass (2007–2011, 2016)
 Jared Melville - drums (2008)
 Peter Revesz - bass (2008)
 Tony Barber - bass (2008)
 Jamie Oliver - drums (2005–2021)
 Kevin Nixon - drums (2021)
 Steven Donnelly - bass (2022 Irish tour dates)
 "Magic" Dave Humphries - drums (2021–2022)

Discography

Studio albums
Another Kind of Blues (1979) (UK No. 21)
Brand New Age (1980) (UK No. 18)
Diminished Responsibility (1981) (UK No. 18)
Endangered Species (1982)
Flood of Lies (1983)
Huntington Beach (1985)
Japan Today (1987)
Killing Time (1988)
Mad Cow Fever (1991)
Normal Service Resumed (1993)
Occupied (1996)
Peel Sessions (1997)
Quintessentials (1997)
Riot (1997)
Timewarp (2001)
Universal (2002)
Work in Progress (10 January 2011)
XXIV (6 February 2013)
Yellow Leader (3 August 2015)
Ziezo  (2 May 2016)
Subversions (22 June 2018)
Subversions II (28 June 2019)
Reverse Engineering (1 July 2022)

Compilation albums
 Recorded 1979–1981 (1982)
 Demonstration Tapes (1984)
 Subs Standards (1986)
 Raw Material (1986)
 A.W.O.L. (1987) (U.S only release)
 The Singles 1978–1982 (1989)
 Down on the Farm (A collection of the less obvious) (1991)
 Los Exitos En Singles 1978–1985 (1992) (Argentinian release)
 Scum of the Earth-Best Of (1993)
 The Punk Is Back (1995)
 Self-Destruct – Punk Can Take It 2 (1997)
 Punk Rock Rarities (1998)
 The Punk Singles Collection (1998)
 Sub Mission: The Best of the U.K. Subs 1982–1998 (1999)
 Time Warp: Greatest Hits (2001)
 Before You Were Punk (2004)
 Original Punks Original Hits (2006)
 An Introduction to The U.K. Subs (2006)
 Complete Riot (2006)
 Greatest Hits (2009)

Live albums
 Live Kicks (1979) (Recorded Live at the Roxy 1977)
 Crash Course (1980) (UK No. 8)
 Dance & Travel in the Robot Age  (1980) (Bootleg live album recorded in Milan)
 Live in London (1980) (Australian release of "Live Kicks" plus the rest of "A Farwell to the Roxy")
Danger: The Chaos Tape (1981 - re-released in 2021)
Gross Out USA (Live) (1984)
 Left For Dead (1986)
In Action (10th Anniversary) (1986)
Live in Paris (1989)
 Europe Calling (1990)
 Live At the Pipeline (1996) (USA)
 Live in the Warzone (1998)
 Countdown (Live) (2001)
 World War (Live) (2003)
 Staffordshire Bull (Live) (2004)
 Live & Loud (2005)
Violent State (2005)

EPs
 "C.I.D." (1978) (EP)
 "Stranglehold" (1979) (EP)
 "Tomorrows Girls" (1979) (EP)
 "She's Not There" / "Kicks" (EP) – 1979 – No. 36 UK
 "Warhead" (1980) (EP)
 "Teenage" (1980) (EP)
 "Keep on Running EP Version" (1981)
 "Shake Up The City" (1982) (EP)
"Another Typical City" (1983) (EP)
"The Magic" (1984) (EP)
 "This Gun Says" (1985) (EP)
 "Live in Holland" (1986) (EP)
"Hey Santa" (1987) (EP)
"Motivator" (1988) (EP)
"Sabre Dance" (1989) (EP)
 "The Road is Long, The Road is Hard" (1993) (EP)
 "War on the Pentagon" (1997) (EP) (U.S. only)
 "Day of the Dead" (1997) (EP) (U.S. only)
 "Cyberjunk" (1997) (EP) (U.S. only)
 "Riot" (1998) (EP)
 "The Revolution's Here" (2000) (EP)
 "Warhead" (2008) (CD EP)
 "Screaming Senile"(2018) (EP)

Singles
 "Stranglehold" – 1979 – No. 26 UK
 "Tomorrow's Girls" – 1979 – No. 28 UK
 "Warhead" – 1980 – No. 30 UK
 "Teenage" – 1980 – No. 32 UK
 "Party in Paris" – 1980 – No. 37 UK
 "Keep On Runnin' (Till You Burn)" – 1981 – No. 41
 "Countdown" (1981)
 "Another Typical City" (1983)
 "Postcard from L.A." (Split single) (1994) (U.S. only)
 "Betrayal" (1995) (U.S. only)
 "Drunken Sailor" (2002)
 "666 Yeah" (2006)
 "Product Supply" (2011)
 "Sensei" (2022)

Compilation appearances
 Punk And Disorderly III – The Final Solution (1983) 
 Backstage pass – Pronit (1986)
 Hardcore Breakout USA (1990)
 Snowboard Addiction - Fun Ride (1994)
 Skaters Gear - 6 (1995)
 Hardcore Breakout USA Volume 2 (1995)
 The British Punk Invasion Vol 2 (1996)
 The Punk, The Bad & The Ugly (1997)
 At War With Society (1998)
 At War With Society – II  (1999)
 A Triple Dose Of Punk (1999)
 Mighty Attack (1999)
 Smells Like Bleach: A Punk Tribute to Nirvana (2001)
 Angry Songs and Bitter Words (2003)
 Hardcore Breakout USA 1,2,3,... (2004)
 Radio Olmos 1993 (two UK Subs tracks recorded live in an Argentinian prison)

Tributes and references
 "I Lost My Love (to a UK Sub)" track by The Gonads (1982)
 "(Give Me) Charlie Harper (Any Day)" track by The Bus Station Loonies (1996)
 "Uncle Charlie" track from The Cage by Anti Nowhere League (2016)
"Song For Charlie" track from Many of My Friends Are Simians But Only A Few Are Gorillas by I Am Chimp! (2015)

References

External links

UK Subs Online Archive

Musical groups from London
English punk rock groups
Street punk groups
Oi! groups
Musical groups established in 1976